Scopula rebaptisa is a moth of the  family Geometridae. It is found on the island of Grande Comore in the Comoros.

References

Moths described in 1985
rebaptisa
Moths of the Comoros
Endemic fauna of the Comoros